Lucas Darío Ortíz Cacharrón (born 26 May 1999) is a Uruguayan footballer who plays as a forward for Racing Club in the Uruguayan Primera División.

Career

Racing Club
A graduate of the club's youth academy, Ortíz made his debut for Racing Club on 11 August 2018 in 1-0 defeat to Torque.

Career statistics

Club

References

External links
 
 
 
 

1999 births
Living people
Racing Club de Montevideo players
Uruguayan Primera División players
Uruguayan Segunda División players
Uruguayan footballers
Association football forwards